The Witches' Market, also known as El Mercado de las Brujas and La Hechiceria, is a popular tourist attraction located in Cerro Cumbre, a mountain clearing in La Paz, Bolivia. The market is run by local witch doctors known as yatiri, who sell potions, dried frogs, medicinal plants like retama, and armadillos used in Bolivian rituals. The yatiri can be easily identified by their black hats and coca pouches containing amulets, talismans and powders that promise luck, beauty and fertility. Most famous of all the items sold in The Witches' Market are the dried llama fetuses. These llama fetuses are buried under the foundations of many Bolivian houses as a sacred offering to the goddess Pachamama.

References

External links

Tourist attractions in Bolivia
Buildings and structures in La Paz Department (Bolivia)
Tourist attractions in La Paz Department (Bolivia)
Occult markets
Retail markets in Bolivia